The United Nations Educational, Scientific and Cultural Organization (UNESCO) designates World Heritage Sites of outstanding universal value to cultural or natural heritage which  have been nominated by countries which are signatories to the UNESCO World Heritage Convention, established in 1972. Cultural heritage consists of monuments (such as architectural works, monumental sculptures, or inscriptions), groups of buildings, and sites (including archaeological sites). Natural features (consisting of physical and biological formations), geological and physiographical formations (including habitats of threatened species of animals and plants), and natural sites which are important from the point of view of science, conservation or natural beauty, are defined as natural heritage. Serbia succeeded the convention on 11 September 2001, following the breakup of Yugoslavia.

, there are five sites in Serbia on the list and eleven on the tentative list. The first site in Serbia to be added to the list was Stari Ras and Sopoćani, inscribed at the 3rd UNESCO session in 1979. Further sites were added to the list in 1986, 2004, 2007, and 2017. All are listed as cultural sites, as determined by the organization's selection criteria. Four out of five sites date to the medieval period while the fifth, the Gamzigrad complex, dates to late antiquity. The Medieval Monuments in Kosovo site, first added to the list in 2004 and expanded two years later, has been on UNESCO's list of endangered sites since 2006 due to difficulties in its management and conservation stemming from the region's political instability. The Stećci Medieval Tombstones Graveyards site is a transnational entry, shared with three neighboring countries.

World Heritage Sites
UNESCO lists sites under ten criteria; each entry must meet at least one of the criteria. Criteria i through vi are cultural, and vii through x are natural.

Tentative list
In addition to the sites inscribed on the World Heritage list, member states can maintain a list of tentative sites that they may consider for nomination. Nominations for the World Heritage list are only accepted if the site was previously listed on the tentative list. , Serbia recorded eleven sites on its tentative list.

See also
 Cultural Heritage of Serbia
 Immovable Cultural Heritage of Great Importance (Serbia)
 List of protected natural resources in Serbia
 List of fortifications in Serbia

Footnotes

References

Serbia
World Heritage Sites

World Heritage Sites